Redford Pennycook (born 27 November 1985) is a rugby union player for Bristol in the RFU Championship. A flanker, Pennycook played for Bristol for five seasons before joining Newcastle Falcons in summer 2010. He returned to Bristol in February 2012. His brother is former Bristol Rugby player Chevvy Pennycook.

References

External links
Bristol Rugby profile

1985 births
Living people
Bristol Bears players
English rugby union players
Rugby union flankers